Ľubotín is a village and municipality in Stará Ľubovňa District in the Prešov Region of northern Slovakia.

History
In historical records the village was mentioned for the first time in 1330. The oldest record comes from a priest Štefan de Lubentin from the year 1330. It is thought that Ľubotín belongs to the oldest Slovak villages, already existing in the 11th century. The coat-of-arms of the village (Madonna with baby Jesus) was firstly used in the first half of 14th century. The hundredth anniversary of the church's consecration was celebrated on 6 November 2007 at the presence of Alojz Tkáč, the archbishop of Košice.

Monuments
The sacral monument is church dedicated to name of Virgin Mary form year 1905 (Roman Catholic) - one boat with superiored tower. The church is an imitation of Romanesque style.

Interior of church 

In the interior of church is a boat on the facade with altar. There is a picture of Saint Mary standing on snake's head. On the sides there are statues connected with a motive of picture. On the right side there is statue of St. Jozef with Jesus on arms. On the left side there is St. Ann (mother of virgin Mary) with small Mary. The pride of the church is the choir with historical pipe one-manual organ from year 1906.

Exterior of church 

In the exterior of church over the entrance on the sides, in the niches there are renovationed statues of St. Cyril and Metod.

Geography
The municipality lies at an elevation of 490 metres (1,610 ft) and covers an area of 10.845 km² (4.187 mi²). It has a population of about 1338 people.

External links
http://www.statistics.sk/mosmis/eng/run.html
 :sk:Ľubotín
http://www.lubotin.sk/

Villages and municipalities in Stará Ľubovňa District
Šariš